Value Migration: How to Think Several Moves Ahead of the Competition is a non-fiction book by American business consultant Adrian Slywotzky. The text was initially published by Harvard Business Review Press on November 1, 1995 as a part of Management of Innovation and Change series.

Overview
Value migration as a concept is a flow of economic value from outmoded, obsolete businesses towards the others with superior business designs. The latter ones are better positioned to create utility and comfort for customers. In this book, the author describes the skills that managers and owners need to identify and to capture these value shifts. He posits that the change in a business landscape is, in fact, inevitable and identifies seven patterns of value migration that managers should know.

See also
 5 forces model
 Business models
 Competitive advantage
 Coopetition
 Core competency
 Profit from the Core
 Strategic management

References

External links
Google books

1995 non-fiction books
American non-fiction books
Business books
Finance books